SPA Naoiri is a 0.889mile (1.430 km) motorcycle racing circuit in 510-15 Urahara, Kamitagita aza, Naoiri-machi Ohaza, Naoiri District, Ōita Prefecture 878-0403, West Japan.

References

External links 
SPA Naoiri Official site (Japanese)

Motorsport venues in Japan
Sports venues in Ōita Prefecture